Cliff Jordan is an album by American jazz saxophonist Clifford Jordan featuring performances recorded in 1957 and released on the Blue Note label.

Reception
The Allmusic review by awarded the album 3 stars.

Track listing
All compositions by Cliff Jordan except as indicated
 "Not Guilty" - 11:43
 "St. John" (John Jenkins) - 8:18
 "Blue Shoes" (Curtis Fuller) - 9:38
 "Beyond the Blue Horizon" (W. Franke Harling, Leo Robin, Richard A. Whiting) - 6:59
 "Ju-Ba" (Lee Morgan) - 3:55
Recorded at Rudy Van Gelder Studio in Hackensack, New Jersey on June 2, 1957

Personnel
Cliff Jordan - tenor saxophone
Lee Morgan - trumpet (tracks 2, 4 & 5)
Curtis Fuller - trombone (tracks 1-4)
John Jenkins - alto saxophone
Ray Bryant - piano
Paul Chambers - bass
Art Taylor – drums

References

Blue Note Records albums
Clifford Jordan albums
1957 albums
Albums produced by Alfred Lion
Albums recorded at Van Gelder Studio